Robert Porter Foster (May 24, 1917 – March 10, 2008) was president of Northwest Missouri State University from 1964 to 1977.

During his tenure Northwest's enrollment increased from 500 to 6,500.

Early life
Foster was born in Warrensburg, Missouri and earned a BA from Central Missouri State University in 1939. He was a high school teacher, coach and principal in Carrollton, Missouri High School from 1939 to 1942.

While working on a masters from the University of Missouri, he left to become a lieutenant commander in the U.S. Navy during World War II.  After the war he would be state commander of the Missouri American Legion.

In 1943 he married Virginia Mutz Foster of Maryville, Missouri.

Northwest
After the war they moved to Maryville where he purchased E.L Townsend Grocery Co. which he operated until 1948 when he became registrar and later director of admissions at Northwest.  He finished his masters in 1951 and a Phd from the University of Missouri in 1960.

He served as dean of administration from 1959 until 1964.

Northwest president
He was the first president to deal with increased competition from Missouri Western State University.  His approach was to massively grow the school.  Building built under his watch included:

Garrett-Strong Science Building
Olive DeLuce Fine Arts Building;
Four high-rise residence halls
Donald Valk Building
Expansion of the J.W. Jones Student Union
Colden Hall renovations
Martindale Hall renovations
Administration Building renovations
Memorial Bell Tower - the first building funded by the Northwest Foundation
KXCV

The school changed from a four year school to having a master program resulting in its name change from Northwest Missouri State College to Northwest Missouri State University.

Post presidency
Foster remained active in Maryville after leaving the presidency receiving a Silver Antelope Award for his work in the Boy Scouts.

In 1981 the Robert P. Foster Aquatic Center was named for him.

References

1917 births
2008 deaths
People from Warrensburg, Missouri
Presidents of Northwest Missouri State University
University of Missouri alumni
University of Central Missouri alumni
People from Maryville, Missouri
20th-century American academics